Kingsbury is a city in eastern Guadalupe County, Texas, United States. Kingsbury was a Census-designated place in 2010, when the census reported a population of 782. It is part of the San Antonio Metropolitan Statistical Area.  The election to incorporate Kingsbury into a Type-C Liberty City passed by a landslide vote of 66–2 on May 9, 2015 and the Order to declare Kingsbury a municipality was signed by County Judge Kyle Kutscher on May 19, 2015.

Geography

Demographics

As of the census of 2010, there were 782 people, 302 households, and 229 families residing in Kingsbury. The population density was 22.7 people per square mile (8.8/km2). There were 269 housing units at an average density of 9.3/sq mi (3.6/km2). The racial makeup of city was 91.4% White, 1.3% African American, 1.8% Native American, 6.8% from other races, and 1.7% from two or more races. Hispanic or Latino of any race were 18.2% of the population.

There were 302 households, out of which 29.8% had children under the age of 18 living with them, 62.3% were married couples living together, 10.6% had a female householder with no husband present, and 24.2% were non-families. 17.9% of all households were made up of individuals, and 6.0% had someone living alone who was 65 years of age or older. The average household size was 2.59 and the average family size was 2.95.

In Kingsbury, the population was spread out, with 23.78% under the age of 20, 3.7% from 20 to 24, 29.4% from 25 to 44, 27.1% from 45 to 64, and 9.8% who were 65 years of age or older. The median age was 38 years. For every 100 females, there were 99.4 males. For every 100 females age 18 and over, there were 95.6 males.

The median income for a household in the CDP was $50,156, and the median income for a family was $60,536. Males had a median income of $38,750 versus $27,750 for females. The per capita income for the CDP was $21,744. About 4.3% of families and 8.7% of the population were below the poverty line, including 11.4% of those under age 18 and 9.6% of those age 65 or over.

Education

Kingsbury is served by the Seguin Independent School District, Luling Independent School District, and the Prairie Lea Independent School District.

City of Kingsbury

The City of Kingsbury incorporated in 2015.  The first City Commission consists of:  Shirley Nolen – Mayor, Janet Ignasiak – City Commissioner, Alison Heinemeier – City Commissioner, Nelda Hotchkiss – City Clerk, Sam Drugan – City Attorney, Art Martinez de Vara – City Attorney.

The inaugural City Commission Meeting was held Saturday, November 21, 2015 in the Kingsbury Baptist Church Fellowship Hall.  Guadalupe County Commissioners Court Judge Kyle Kutscher delivered the oaths to Mayor Nolen and Commissioners Heinemier and Ignaskiak.  Texas Senator Judith Zaffirini of the 21st District attended the meeting and presented the new Kingsbury City Commission with congratulatory certificates.  The Senator also gave Mayor Nolen a Senate-sized presentation set gavel and sound block.  Also in attendance were Von Ormy Councilmember Sally Martinez, Guadalupe County Commissioner Greg Seidenberger, and Kelly Follis representing Senator Donna Campbell.

In popular culture

Kingsbury was the setting of Dierks Bentley's music video of the song "What Was I Thinkin'". It is also home to Joe Matlock, author of The Dance, Twilight Of Fury and The Other Side Of Courage.
Kingsbury was also the setting for the Scott H. Biram song "I See The Light/What's His Name?"

References

External links

City of Kingsbury

Cities in Texas
Cities in Guadalupe County, Texas
Former census-designated places in Texas
Greater San Antonio
Populated places established in 2015